The 2022 Tennessee Volunteers baseball team represented the University of Tennessee in the 2022 NCAA Division I baseball season. The Volunteers played their home games at Lindsey Nelson Stadium.

Previous season

The Volunteers finished 50–18, 20–10 in the SEC to finish in first place in the East division. They hosted the 2021 Knoxville Regional and finished 3–0. The Vols then hosted LSU in the Knoxville Super Regional, winning the first two games to advance to their first College World Series since 2005. The Vols lost both of their games in Omaha to Virginia and Texas.

Schedule and results

Rankings

Standings

Results

References

Tennessee
Tennessee Volunteers baseball seasons
Tennessee Volunteers baseball
Tennessee